Santo Domingo Airport is an airport serving Santo Domingo, a Pacific coastal town in the Valparaíso Region of Chile.

The Santo Domingo VOR-DME (Ident:SNO) and non-directional beacon (Ident:SNO) are located on the field.

See also

Transport in Chile
List of airports in Chile

References

External links
OpenStreetMap - Santo Domingo
OurAirports - Santo Domingo
SkyVector - Santo Domingo

Airports in Chile
Airports in Valparaíso Region